Frisk is a Swedish surname.  It is one of many Swedish army names originally given to soldiers to make their names more distinctive. Notable people with the surname include:

Anders Frisk (born 1963), Swedish football referee
Andreas Frisk (born 1984), Swedish ice hockey player
Emil Frisk (1874–1922), American baseball player
Helena Frisk (born 1965), Swedish politician of the Social Democratic Party  
Hjalmar Frisk (1900–1984), Swedish linguist and philologist
Johanna Frisk (born 1986), Swedish football player 
Niclas Frisk (born 1969), Swedish musician
Patrik Frisk, American businessman, CEO of Under Armour 
Viktor Frisk (born 1995), Swedish fashion blogger and singer

Swedish-language surnames